Z45 45 

Year 521 (DXXI) was a common year starting on Friday (link will display the full calendar) of the Julian calendar. At the time, it was known as the Year of the Consulship of Sabbatius and Valerius (or, less frequently, year 1274 Ab urbe condita). The denomination 521 for this year has been used since the early medieval period, when the Anno Domini calendar era became the prevalent method in Europe for naming years.

Events 
 By place 
 Byzantine Empire 
 Future Byzantine emperor Justinian, age 39, is appointed consul. He later becomes Commander-in-chief of the Army of the East.

 Arabia 
 Ma`adikarib Ya`fur becomes king, supported by the Aksumites; he begins a military campaign against the Arabian tribes.

 By topic 
 Music 
 Boethius introduces Greek musical letter notation to the West.

 Religion 
 February 22 – Samson of Dol is ordained as bishop in Brittany, on the Feast of the Chair of Saint Peter.
 Ecclesius becomes a bishop of Ravenna.

Births 
 December 7 – Columba, Gaelic Irish missionary monk (d. 597)
 Agericus, bishop of Verdun (approximate date)
 Gao Cheng, high official and regent of Eastern Wei (d. 549)

Deaths 
 July 17 – Magnus Felix Ennodius, bishop and Latin poet
 November 29 – Jacob of Serugh, Syrian poet and theologian

References